Dessert First with Anne Thornton is an American cooking television series that aired on Food Network, and was presented by pastry chef Anne Thornton. The series featured Thornton demonstrating how to prepare different desserts and pastries.

The first season of Dessert First premiered on October 24, 2010 and ended on December 5, 2010. The second season premiered on April 2, 2011 and concluded on June 25, 2011. The series was not renewed for a third season after it was reported that several of Thornton's recipes featured on the series were plagiarized from other chefs, including fellow Food Network chef Ina Garten.

Episodes

Season 1

Season 2

Notes

References

External links
 
 
 Meetinghouse Productions

2010s American cooking television series
2010 American television series debuts
2011 American television series endings
English-language television shows
Food Network original programming
Food reality television series